The Continental AV1790 is an American V12 engine used in armored vehicles. Produced by Continental Motors, the AV1790 was used in a variety of limited production and pilot heavy tanks, including the M53 and M55 howitzers, and the T30 and M103 tanks.

There were also diesel versions (AVDS, Air Cooled, V-engine configuration, Diesel, Superturbocharged) for the M47, M48, and M60 Patton tanks, and the Swedish Stridsvagn 104 (British-built Centurions, re-engined with diesel engines in the 1980s).

Engines prefixes

The engine prefixes are:
 A-Air cooled
 V-Vee cylinder arrangement
 D-Diesel
 S-Supercharged
 1790-Displacement in Cubic Inches

Specifications

Gasoline versions

Diesel versions

References

Sources
 Hunnicutt, R. P. Firepower: A History of the American Heavy Tank. Novato, California: Presidio Press, 1988.

External links
 Air Cooled Diesel Tank Engines by Teledyne Continental Motors

Tank engines
World War II tanks of the United States

V12 engines